Rebecca Webster (born 22 October 2000) is an Australian rules footballer with the Geelong Football Club in the AFL Women's (AFLW).

Webster played with Murray Bushrangers in the TAC Cup and Melbourne University in the VFL Women's (VFLW) competition. She was subsequently drafted with selection number seven by Geelong in the 2018 AFL Women's draft, and made her AFLW debut during the first round of the 2019 season, against Collingwood at GMHBA Stadium. She played only four games for Geelong in the 2019 AFLW season, though later that year won the club's VFL Women's best and fairest award.

Webster currently studies a Bachelor of Exercise and Sport Science/Bachelor of Business – Sport Management at Deakin University.

Statistics
Updated to the end of S7 (2022).

|-
| 2019 ||  || 21
| 4 || 0 || 1 || 11 || 15 || 26 || 4 || 4 || 0.0 || 0.0 || 5.0 || 7.7 || 12.7 || 1.0 || 1.0 || 0
|-
| 2020 ||  || 21
| 6 || 0 || 0 || 40 || 37 || 77 || 21 || 16 || 0.0 || 0.0 || 6.7 || 6.2 || 12.9 || 3.5 || 2.7 || 0
|-
| 2021 ||  || 21
| 9 || 2 || 3 || 88 || 48 || 136 || 22 || 25 || 0.2 || 0.3 || 9.8 || 5.3 || 15.1 || 2.4 || 2.8 || 0
|-
| 2022 ||  || 21
| 10 || 3 || 2 || 81 || 87 || 168 || 14 || 63 || 0.3 || 0.2 || 8.7 || 8.7 || 16.8 || 1.4 || 6.3 || 2
|-
| S7 (2022) ||  || 21
| 11 || 2 || 4 || 113 || 81 || 194 || 26 || 40 || 0.2 || 0.4 || 10.3 || 7.4 || 17.6 || 2.4 || 3.6 || 5
|- class=sortbottom
! colspan=3 | Career
! 40 !! 7 !! 10 !! 333 !! 268 !! 601 !! 87 !! 148 !! 0.2 !! 0.3 !! 8.3 !! 6.7 !! 15.0 !! 2.2 !! 3.7 !! 7
|}

References

External links 

Geelong Football Club (AFLW) players
2000 births
Living people
Australian rules footballers from Victoria (Australia)
Sportswomen from Victoria (Australia)
Melbourne University Football Club (VFLW) players
Murray Bushrangers players (NAB League Girls)